Joseph Parrenin (born 16 May 1941 in Trévillers, France) is the incumbent first Vice-President of the Franche-Comté Regional Council.

In 2002, he sought re-election as a National Assembly deputy for Doubs's 3rd constituency but he was defeated by UMP Marcel Bonnot. In 2007, Parrenin was again defeated by Bonnot.

External links
 Biography of Joseph Parrenin (National Assembly of France)

1941 births
Franche-Comté Regional Councillors
Socialist Party (France) politicians
Living people
Knights of the Ordre national du Mérite